Kuşçuburun railway station is a railway station on the Southern Line of the IZBAN commuter rail system just southeast of Kuşçuburun, Turkey. The station was opened on 6 February 2016 with commuter trains from Alsancak Terminal in Izmir to Torbalı.

Connections
ESHOT operates city bus service to the station.

References

Railway stations in İzmir Province
Railway stations opened in 2016